Kohas AG was a Swiss metal fabrication company established in the late 1980s.

On 30 March 2006, the company and the company president were added to the list of designees supporting the proliferation of weapons of mass destruction by the United States.
According to the US, nearly half of the company's shares are held by Korea Ryongwang Trading Corporation(조선영광무역회사), a subsidiary of the Korea Ryonbong General Corporation.

Kohas was declared bankrupt on 12 January 2021 by the civil court of Sarine, in Fribourg in Switzerland.

References

See also
Foreign relations of North Korea
List of Swiss companies

Manufacturing companies of Switzerland
Economy of North Korea